What If You Died Tomorrow? is a 1973 play written by David Williamson. It was commissioned by the Old Tote Theatre Company for its first drama season at the new Sydney Opera House.

Background
The play has a number of autobiographical elements, being about a doctor turned novelist and journalist who have left their respective spouses to live in an artists colony. David Williamson was an engineer turned playwright who lived in an artists colony in Eltham with wife Kristin after both left their respective spouses. Williamson's parents claimed the characters of the parents were based on them. It was Williamson's first play to deal with inter-generational conflicts on stage.

Productions Outside Australia
The Old Tote production was performed in England in September 1974, making it the first full Australian production to have played in London since Summer of the Seventeenth Doll.

References

Notes
Kiernan, Brian, David Williamson: A Writer's Career, Currency Press, 1996

External links

1973 plays
Plays by David Williamson